Peter Petrovich von Weymarn (commonly mis-spelt von Weimarn) (July 17, 1879 – June 2, 1935) was a chemist known for his groundwork in colloid science.

Biography
He was born in St. Petersburg in 1879. He served as president of the Urals Metallurgical Institute in Ekaterinburg and was also associated with the Vladivostok Polytechnic University (1920–1922). In 1922 he moved to Japan, where he researched at the Imperial Industrial Research Institute in Osaka. He then moved to Shanghai, where he worked at the Technical Center. He died in Shanghai on June 2, 1935.

In 1906 he stated the von Weymarn law: Colloidal dispersions are obtained from very dilute or very concentrated solutions but not from intermediate solutions. The relative
supersaturation ratio herein is defined by S=(Q-L)/L (where Q is the amount of the dissolved material and L is its solubility).

Bibliography 
von Weimarn, P P: "Der kolloide Zustand als allgemeine Eigenschaft der Materie (I-III)", Russ. Phys. Chem. Gesellschaft, 1906
von Weimarn, P P: "Grundzüge der Dispersoidchemie", Dresden 1911 Digital edition by the University and State Library Düsseldorf
von Weimarn, P P: "Die Allgemeinheit des Kolloidzustandes", Dresden 1925

References

1879 births
1935 deaths
Chemists from the Russian Empire
Soviet expatriates in Japan
Soviet emigrants to China
Scientists from Saint Petersburg
Saint Petersburg Mining University alumni